Jürgen Tschan (born 17 February 1947) is a German former racing cyclist. He won the German National Road Race in 1971. He also competed at the 1968 Summer Olympics.

References

External links
 

1947 births
Living people
German male cyclists
Sportspeople from Mannheim
German cycling road race champions
Olympic cyclists of West Germany
Cyclists at the 1968 Summer Olympics
Cyclists from Baden-Württemberg
20th-century German people